Levee Low Moan: Soul Gestures in Southern Blue, Vol. 3 is an album by Wynton Marsalis that was released in 1991. The album reached a peak position of number 8 on Top Jazz Albums chart of Billboard magazine.

Reception

The AllMusic reviewer wrote: "although the individual solos are fine, not much really happens; overall it is a rather weird tribute to the blues". The Billboard reviewer of all three volumes of Soul Gestures in Southern Blue commented on their "atmosphere of politeness, an absence of swing, and a somewhat shocking lack of true blues feeling". It is not clear whether the two reviewers cited above are qualified specialists in the Jazz genre, as there is no background professional or biographical information given.

Track listing
All tracks are composed and performed by Wynton Marsalis unless otherwise noted.
Levee Low Moan – 11:15
Jig's Jig – 8:09
So This Is Jazz, Huh? – 7:00
In the House of Williams – 10:06 (Todd Williams)
Superb Starling – 11:39

References

External links

Levee Low Moan (Soul Gestures In Southern Blue, Vol. 3) on official Wynton Marsalis website

1991 albums
Columbia Records albums
Wynton Marsalis albums